Esther Acebo (born 19 January 1983) is a Spanish actress, presenter and reporter. As an actress she has appeared in Los encantados (2016) and achieved worldwide fame in Money Heist (2017).

Biography 

Acebo studied physical activity and Sport sciences at the University of Castilla–La Mancha. Her first opportunity came as host of the children's program Kosmi Club. After this, she hosted Non Stop People, on the channel Movistar+.

She continued to work as an actress and made her debut on national television with Ángel o Demonio (Telecinco). She also made the leap to the cinema with a film by Ricardo Dávila, Los Encantados (The Enchanted Ones), that was released through the Internet.

On May 2, 2017 Money Heist premiered in which she played Mónica Gaztambide (Stockholm), that later became one of the main characters. She starred in the 2019 miniseries Antes de perder.

References

External links
 

1983 births
Living people
21st-century Spanish actresses
Actresses from Madrid
Spanish film actresses
Spanish television actresses
University of Castilla–La Mancha alumni